BHG may refer to:

Bankers Healthcare Group, an American company that provides financing to healthcare professionals
Beijing Hualian Group, a Chinese retailer in Beijing
Bergen Handelsgymnasium, an upper secondary school in Bergen, Norway
Bibliotheca Hagiographica Graeca, a catalogue of Greek hagiographic materials
Big Huge Games, a video game developer in Timonium, Maryland
Black-headed gull, a small gull
Bloodhound Gang, an American rock band
Blue Harbour Group, an American investment firm

See also
Better Homes and Gardens (disambiguation)